Samefolket (The Sámi People) is a Sámi news magazine published from Jåhkåmåhkke, Sweden. Its motto is "Den Samiska Kultur- och Samhällstidskriften" (The Sámi Culture and Society Magazine). Having published regularly since 1918, Samefolket is considered one of the oldest indigenous periodicals in the world.

History
Samefolket was founded by Torkel Tomasson following the first national meeting of the Swedish Sámi, which was held in Östersund in 1918 on the heels of the pan-national Sámi Assembly of 1917. Tomasson called the new paper Samefolkets Egen Tidning (The Sámi People's Newspaper). In the first issue, Tomasson called for people to use the word "Sámi" instead of "Lapp," both as an expression of pride in the Sámi people and because of negative associations in Swedish with the word Lapp. Tomasson served as editor-in-chief of the paper until his death in 1940, publishing many articles on Sámi culture and identity.

In 1960, Samefolkets Egen Tidning was rebranded as Samefolket (The Sámi People).

Samefolket mainly reports on cultural and political events in Sápmi, but it periodically also covers issues of importance to other indigenous peoples. The magazine publishes primarily in Swedish, but also contains stories in Norwegian and Sámi languages spoken in Sweden, primarily Northern, Lule, and Southern Sámi.

Editors
 Torkel Tomasson: 1918–1940
 : 1940–1960
 Israel Ruong: 1969–1973
 Olle Andersson: 1974–1996
 Gustaf Jillker: 1996–2003
 Åsa Lindstrand: 2003

References

1918 establishments in Sweden
Magazines published in Sweden
Magazines established in 1918
Sámi in Sweden
Sámi magazines
Swedish-language magazines